Episcepsis lenaeus is a moth of the family Erebidae. It was described by Pieter Cramer in 1780. It is found from Mexico to the Guianas.

Description
Head and thorax fuscous brown; back of head and shoulders with paired crimson spots; fore coxae crimson; abdomen metallic blue, the dorsal patch of hair brown; the ventral surface fuscous, with white patches on the first three segments. Forewing fuscous brown, with apical white patch. Hindwing fuscous with a slight bluish tinge; some hyaline in, below, and beyond cell; the tuft on inner area white. (Female) Abdomen without white patches below. Wingspan 36 mm.

References

External links
  Retrieved April 20, 2018.
Episcepsis lenaeus at BHL

Euchromiina
Moths described in 1780